Leigh-on-Sea, commonly referred to simply as Leigh, is a town and civil parish in the City of Southend-on-Sea, in the ceremonial county of Essex, England. In 2011, it had a population of 22,509.

Geography

Leigh-on-Sea is on the northern side of the Thames Estuary, a few miles from the open waters of the North Sea to the east, and a similar distance from the Kent coast to the south. The coastal environs of the town feature a nature reserve at Two Tree Island and a centrally located beach adjacent to Bell Wharf. At low tide Leigh's foreshore has a wide expanse of mud flats and creeks, extending offshore towards the deep water channel of the Thames (Yantlet Channel).

History

Origins
Archaeological finds of pottery and coins from Romano-British era in the locality suggest early settlement. From at least the Saxon period a hilltop clearing amidst the woodland that covered much of the surrounding area (the Rochford Hundred) of Essex came to be known as Leigh.

A place of minor economic importance at the time of the Norman Conquest, a reference to Leigh (Legra) appears in the Domesday Book survey of 1086.

St Clement's Church was rebuilt in the late 15th century or early 16th century, although the list of rectors dates back 1248. The fabric of the church is of Kentish ragstone and flint rubble, with a Tudor porch constructed of red brick. The mediaeval structure of the church was added to and altered during the 19th and early 20th centuries. The chancel was extended at the east end in 1872 by C. F. Haywood; Ernest Geldart added the south aisle in 1897, and there were a number of alterations made by Sir Charles Nicholson in 1913 and 1919. The tower at the west end was a prominent landmark for shipping on the Thames Estuary, and the building contains a good selection of stained glass dating from between the 18th and 20th centuries. The building is Grade II* listed by Historic England, and a key factor for this rating was the sympathetic nature of the 19th and 20th century additions.

Leigh Hall, a medieval manor house demolished in the early 20th century, was once situated near the ancient eastern manorial boundary of Leigh and Prittlewell.

Robert Eden, who became rector of Leigh in 1837, demolished the previous rectory and commissioned a large new one, which was completed in 1838. One quarter of the building remains today as Leigh Library, as the other wings of the building were demolished by Southend Corporation when they acquired the building and the surrounding land. The rectory and grounds occupied a  site, and the work carried out by Eden included the construction of Rectory Grove as a public right of way, which replaced an existing cliff-top path called Chess Lane. Leigh Library was designated as a listed building at Grade II in 1974.

'Old Leigh'
In the 11th century Leigh was a marginal community of homesteads. The Domesday Book records 'five smallholders above the water who do not hold land', who were probably engaged in fishing thus giving Leigh a claim to nearly a thousand years of activity in the fishing industry.

The main seafood catch from Leigh fishing boats has always been shellfish and whitebait. Many of the local trawlers were at one time bawleys, and two of Old Leigh's pubs – the Peter Boat and Ye Olde Smack – owe their names to types of local fishing boat.

The riverside settlement of 'Old Leigh', or 'The Old Town', is historically significant; it was once on the primary shipping route to London. From the Middle Ages until the turn of the 20th century, Old Leigh hosted the settlement's market square, and high street (known as Leigh Strand). Elizabethan historian William Camden (1551–1623) described Leigh as "a proper fine little towne and verie full of stout and adventurous sailers". By the 1740s however, Leigh's deep water access had become silted up (as attested to by John Wesley) and the village was in decline as an anchorage and port of call.

Modern era
Broadway developed between the 1870s and the 1920s from a residential street to a commercial parade of shopfronts, as the town began to expand. During the 1920s, Broadway was extended further west with the demolition of a large manor house, Black House/Leigh House (built 1620).

In 1983 Leigh gained its own paper, Leigh Times, and in 1996 gained its own Town Council.

During the 1990s and the early 21st century Leigh-on-Sea went through more change: the growing dominance of out-of-town, 24-hour supermarkets and retail parks, as well as the arrival and popularity of retail online shopping, meant that much local business had to reinvent itself, either as venues for socialising, or to offer niche services and products to cater for the town's changing demographic.

Leigh-on-Sea has frequently been cited as one of the best places to live in the UK, owing to factors such as its proximity to London, nearby outstanding Westcliff and Southend grammar schools, good access to sports and arts activities, multiple opportunities to develop skills, and a strong sense of belonging and community spirit. A 2018 survey by Rightmove found that Leigh-on-Sea was the place in the UK where people were happiest living.

Reports in the local newspaper; the Southend Echo, have suggested (with such opinion supported by many local business owners) that Southend-on-Sea City Centre (to avoid the demise of many ‘High Streets’) needs to ‘follow’ the example of Leigh Broadway and Leigh Road…with independent businesses, rather than national chains,  being the prime tenants. 

On 15 October 2021, Sir David Amess, the local Member of Parliament, was stabbed to death at a constituency surgery being held in Belfairs Methodist Church in the town.

Transport
Leigh-on-Sea is served by Leigh-on-Sea railway station on the London, Tilbury and Southend line. Regular, daily bus services run between Southend-on-Sea, Benfleet, Canvey Island, Basildon, Rayleigh and Chelmsford. Scheduled flights to national and European destinations operate out of nearby London Southend Airport.

The current railway station is situated near the western end of Old Leigh marina. Built in 1934, it replaced the original station, which was opposite Bell Wharf.

Governance
Leigh-on-Sea is a district of Southend-on-Sea, and includes the electoral wards Belfairs, Blenheim Park, Eastwood Park, Leigh and West Leigh. The two latter Electoral Wards and one Poll District of Belfairs and Blenheim Park Wards are included in the Leigh-on-Sea Town Council area, which is a civil parish. It is represented in Parliament in the Southend West constituency, by Anna Firth. 

The population of the entire district taken at the 2011 Census was 38,931.

Festivals and activities
Several annual events have become well established, including Leigh Regatta, Leigh Folk Festival and The Leigh Art Trail. The regatta is held over one weekend in September.

Museums and galleries 
Leigh Heritage Centre is located in the Old Smithy and serves as a museum for Old Leigh. It is run by the Leigh Society, who have also opened the next-door Plumbs Cottage, a restored and substantially rebuilt 1850s fisherman's cottage.

Old Leigh Art Studios is a commercial gallery with artists studios. It was established by the artist Sheila Appleton and potter Richard Baxter in 1991. They have since been joined by painter Ian Smith and ceramicist Julie O’Sullivan. The studios participate in the annual Leigh Art Trail.

Notable people
John Barber (1919–2004), former Finance Director of Ford of Europe & Managing Director of British Leyland.
Lee Brilleaux, musician
Phil Cornwell, actor, comedian and impressionist
Stephen Cottrell, Archbishop of York since 2020, born in Leigh-on-Sea
Tina Cousins, singer
Robert Eden, rector of Leigh-on-Sea
John Fowles, author
Phill Jupitus, comedian, who moved to Leigh in 2000
David Lloyd, tennis player and businessman
John Lloyd, tennis player
Robert King, footballer and rector of Leigh-on-Sea from 1892 to 1950
Marie Macarte, equestrian performer 
Helen Mirren, actress, born in Hammersmith and brought up in Leigh-on-Sea
Peggy Mount, actress, born in Leigh-on-Sea on 2 May 1918
Julian Parkhill, geneticist, working with pathogens
Vivian Stanshall, artist and musician
Alister Watson, mathematician and alleged member of the Cambridge spy ring
 Rebecca West, author, lived at Marine Parade between 1917 and 1919.
Michael Wilding, actor

References

External links

 Leigh-on-Sea Town Council web site
 The Leigh Society - Leigh Heritage Centre

Populated coastal places in Essex
Port cities and towns of the North Sea
Southend-on-Sea (district)
Towns in Essex